Derek Fox may refer to:

 Derek Fox (Canadian politician) (born 1950), insurance agent and former provincial level politician from Alberta, Canada
 Derek Fox (broadcaster) (born 1947), New Zealand broadcaster, Māori Party candidate and mayor of Wairoa
 Derek Fox (jockey) (born 1992), Irish jockey

See also
Deryck Fox (born 1964), English rugby league footballer